Barranco is one of 43 districts in Lima, Peru. Its current mayor is José Juan Rodríguez Cárdenas.

The district is considered to be the city's most romantic and bohemian, being the home and working place of many of Peru's leading artists, musicians, designers and photographers. In the 19th century, it was a very fashionable beach resort for the Limeño aristocracy, and many people used to spend the summer here and in neighboring Chorrillos.  Today, Barranco's beaches are among the most popular within the worldwide surfing community, and a marina completed in 2008 provides state-of-the-art services for its yacht club.

Etymology
The name Barranco is Spanish for ravine. Barranco has two ravines; one in the north where Armendariz Avenue is situated between Miraflores District and Barranco, and one near the central part, the Bajada de los Baños.

History
The District of Barranco was formed from Chorillos District on 26 October 1874.

During the 2010s and 2020s, many high rises and other projects began to be built in Barranco as a result of Urban renewal.

Climate
The cliffs of Chorrillos shield Barranco from colder and more humid winds coming from the South.  As a result, Barranco has a micro-climate that is warmer and drier than many of the other districts of Lima, which are generally more humid, especially between May and October.

Tourism

Bajada de los Baños
The Bajada de los Baños is a walkway which lead from Barranco's municipal park and central business district to the Costa Verde Avenue and the beaches. The walkway was built on a ravine. There is a shanty town built within the ravine.

Bridge of Sighs
The Puente de los Suspiros (translated to Bridge of Sighs) is a bridge built over the Bajada de los Baños. It was inaugurated on 14 February 1876. On the far side of the bridge is a park with a statue of native singer and composer, Chabuca Granda. There is also a church on the north end of the bridge, Iglesia la Ermita. It was built during the 19th century, and its roof has collapsed partially due to renovation issues.

Municipal Park
Barranco's Municipal Park, also known as the Plaza de Armas, is located in central Barranco, where its municipal headquarters, municipal library, and a church are all located. The park has fountains and restaurants.

Barranco Beach
Barranco's beach is famous during the Summer months, when people bathe in its waters. The beach opened a marina for yachts and other boats and ships in 2008.

Contemporary Art Museum
Barranco is home to a Art museum located in the north.

Pedro de Osma Museum
The Pedro de Osma museum is a museum located in Pedro de Osma avenue in the south.

Saenz Peña Avenue
Saenz Peña Avenue is an avenue near the north of the district. It is flanked by an alameda and park. Saenz Peña is home to 19th century architecture and an Obelisk.

Architecture
Barranco has many houses in the colonial and Republican style (called "casonas"), flower-filled parks and streets, and appealing beachfront areas. In the north are near Miraflores and Santiago de Surco, there are many flats and high-rises as a result of Urban renewal. Throughout Miguel Grau Avenue, 19th century houses, casonas, and other buildings line the streets.

Gallery

See also 
 Administrative divisions of Peru

References

External links

Districts of Lima